Strathclair is a locality in the province of Manitoba in Western Canada. It is located northwest of Brandon, Manitoba and is on Highway 16. It lies within the Rural Municipality of Yellowhead. The population is 709 in the 2016 census.

The settlement’s post office opened in 1886 on 35-16-22W and was known as Strathclair Station, became Glenforsa for a time and in 1915 changed to its present name.

Climate
Strathclair is located in southwestern Manitoba and has warm summers and cold winters. The average annual precipitation is 457.1mm (18 inches) with most of it falling in the summer.

References 

 Geographic Names of Manitoba (pg. 264–265) – the Millennium Bureau of Canada

External links 
  Evolution of the Strathclair District by William G. Hillman, Assistant Professor, Brandon University
The Bill and Sue-On Hillman / Strathclair Connection – Memories and Over 100 Photos
RM of Strathclair
R.M. of Strathclair Community Profile
Map of Strathclair R.M. at Statcan

Localities in Manitoba